Anchors Aweigh is a 1945 American musical comedy film directed by George Sidney, starring Frank Sinatra, Kathryn Grayson, and  Gene Kelly, with songs by Jule Styne and Sammy Cahn. The film also features José Iturbi, Pamela Britton, Dean Stockwell, and Sharon McManus.

The plot concerns two sailors on a four-day shore leave in Hollywood, who meet a young boy and his aunt, an aspiring young singer, and try to help her get an audition at Metro-Goldwyn-Mayer. In a live-action/animated fantasy sequence, Kelly dances with Jerry Mouse, the cartoon mouse of the Tom and Jerry series, and Tom Cat has a brief cameo appearance.

The film received mixed reviews but it became a financial success.

Plot
Gunner's Mate Second Class Joe Brady and Seaman First Class Clarence Doolittle are USN sailors who have a four-day leave in Hollywood. Joe has his heart set on spending time with his girl (the never seen) Lola. Clarence, the shy choir boy turned sailor, asks Joe to teach him how to get girls. Donald, a little boy who wants to join the navy, is found wandering around the boulevard by a cop, who takes him to the police station. Clarence and Joe end up being picked up by the cops to help convince Donald to go home. After the two sailors wait at home and entertain Donald, Donald's Aunt Susie arrives. Clarence is smitten with her from the beginning. Susan goes on to tell them that she has been trying to find work in music, and longs to perform with José Iturbi. Trying to make Susan impressed with Clarence, Joe tells her that Clarence is a personal friend of Iturbi, and that he has arranged an audition for Susan with him. That night, they go out to a café (on an MGM recreation of Olvera Street) where Clarence meets a girl from Brooklyn, and they hit it off. The next day, Joe visits Donald's school, and tells the kids the story of how he got his medal, and how he brought happiness to a young lonesome king (played by Jerry the Mouse in an animated sequence), and joy to the forest animals of the kingdom.

Meanwhile, Clarence has been trying to get into Metro-Goldwyn-Mayer Studios to find Iturbi, with no luck. After many failed attempts to speak to Iturbi (including a rehearsal at the Hollywood Bowl), all hope is lost for Joe and Clarence, who want to come clean with Susan and tell her there was no audition. On Clarence and Joe's last day of leave, Susan runs into Iturbi In the studio commissary, who has no idea of the audition. Susan begins to call Joe, whom by now she has fallen in love with, to yell at him. Iturbi stops her and agrees to get her a screen test, which turns out to be very successful. The movie ends as Iturbi conducts the choir in singing "Anchors Aweigh", while Joe and Susan, and Clarence and the "Girl from Brooklyn," kiss.

Cast

Songs
Songs by Jule Styne and Sammy Cahn except where noted:
 "Main Title" – MGM Studio and Orchestra
 "Anchors Aweigh" (Zimmerman, Miles) – MGM Studio and Orchestra and Jose Iturbi
 "We Hate to Leave" – Gene Kelly & Frank Sinatra
 "Brahms' Lullaby" – Frank Sinatra (sung to Donald to come back again with Joe)
 "I Begged Her" – Gene Kelly & Frank Sinatra
 "If You Knew Susie" (DeSylva, Meyer) – Frank Sinatra & Gene Kelly
 "Jealousy"  (Jacob Gade) – Kathryn Grayson
 "What Makes the Sunset" – Frank Sinatra
 "(All of a Sudden) My Heart Sings" (from the French song "Ma Mie" by Henri Laurent Herpin; English lyric by Harold Rome) – Kathryn Grayson
 "The Donkey Serenade" – Jose Iturbi
 "The King Who Couldn't Sing and Dance" – Gene Kelly
 "The Worry Song" (Ralph Freed, Sammy Fain) – Gene Kelly & Sara Berner (as Jerry Mouse from the cartoons "Tom and Jerry")
 "The Charm of You" – Frank Sinatra (featuring a rare appearance of Guitarist Benito Mayorga with the orchestra)
 "Las Chiapanecas" – Gene Kelly & Sharon McManus
 "Liszt's Hungarian Rhapsody No. 2" – Jose Iturbi
 "I Fall in Love Too Easily" – Frank Sinatra
 "La cumparsita" (Gerardo Matos Rodríguez) – Gene Kelly 
 "Waltz Serenade" (Tchaikovsky) – Kathryn Grayson 
 "Anchors Aweigh (Reprise)" – Dean Stockwell
 "Anchors Aweigh (Reprise 2)" – MGM Studio and Orchestra Chorus (THE END)

Production
The film was written by Natalie Marcin (story) and Isobel Lennart (screenplay) and directed by George Sidney. It was the first of three buddy pictures teaming the cocky dancing Kelly with the (against type) shy singing Sinatra, followed by Take Me Out To The Ball Game and On the Town, both in 1949. The production tried to mix some of the more successful story elements and set-pieces from earlier MGM musical hits, such as Meet Me in St. Louis (1944).

The movie is remembered for the musical number in which Gene Kelly dances seamlessly with the animated Jerry Mouse (voiced by Sara Berner). Tom Cat appears briefly as a butler in the sequence supervised by William Hanna and Joseph Barbera. The animation was entirely undertaken by Kenneth Muse, Ray Patterson and Ed Barge. Originally, the producers wanted to use Mickey Mouse for this segment.  Some sources claim Walt Disney initially agreed to loan out Mickey, but Roy Disney rejected the deal. According to Bob Thomas's book on Roy Disney, the studio was in debt after World War II and they were focusing on trying to release their own films out on time. According to Roy, they had no business making cartoons for other people. After Disney turned the offer down, Kelly went to Fred Quimby, the head of MGM's cartoon studio. Quimby was also not interested, but Kelly persisted, reportedly showing up at Hanna and Barbera's office to press the case. The dance sequence required meticulous storyboarding; after Kelly's dance was filmed, the animators used rotoscoping to painstakingly match the animated character's movement to Kelly's, even down to their shadows cast on the polished dance floor.

The film offers rare color glimpses of the wartime MGM studio, including the Thalberg Building, the frontgate, the backlot, the commissary, and one of the scoring stages, as well as an on-screen performance by real members of the MGM studio orchestra. During the soundstage scenes the operation of MGM’s latest camera mounted on a heavy boom is extensively demonstrated, including a side-bolted cutout viewfinder for the cinematographer to line up the shots and the operators deftly swiveling the pan controls or pulling the focus.

There is also a memorable exterior scene at the Hollywood Bowl, where Sinatra sings "I Fall in Love Too Easily", after Iturbi and a group of young pianists have performed an arrangement of Franz Liszt's Hungarian Rhapsody No. 2. In the audition scene with Iturbi, Grayson sings a special arrangement by Earl Brent for coloratura soprano and orchestra of the waltz from Pyotr Ilyich Tchaikovsky's Serenade for Strings.  And Iturbi conducts the United States Navy Band for a patriotic rendition of the title tune. Some of the scenes in this film were later featured in the That's Entertainment! (1974) tributes to MGM.

Reception
Bosley Crowther of The New York Times wrote: "Another humdinger of a musical has been produced by Joe Pasternak for Metro ... for a popular entertainment, 'Anchors Aweigh' is hard to beat." Variety called the film "solid musical fare for all situations. The production numbers are zingy; the songs are extremely listenable; the color treatment outstanding." Harrison's Reports wrote: "Very good mass entertainment. Photographed in Technicolor, the production is extremely lavish, has good comedy, a romance, tuneful songs, and effective dancing. The story is thin, but it has some human interest, and there are so many humorous situations that one is kept laughing most of the way." Film Daily wrote: "Everything that could possibly be crammed into a musical is in evidence in this production ... It is hard to think of an M-G-M musical excelling it. There is no reason why the film should not gain recognition as one of the year's best of its type."

According to MGM records the film earned $4,498,000 in the US and Canada and $2,977,000 elsewhere, resulting in a profit of $2,123,000.

Rotten Tomatoes gives a score of 57% based on 14 reviews.

Awards and honors
 Winner: Academy Award, Original Music Score, Georgie Stoll 
 Nominated: Academy Award, Best Picture
 Nominated: Academy Award, Best Actor, Gene Kelly
 Nominated: Academy Award, Best Cinematography (Color)
 Nominated: Academy Award, Best Song, "I Fall In Love Too Easily" (Words and Music by Sammy Cahn and Jule Styne, Sung by Frank Sinatra)

Award notes
 The contributions to the score of one of the first black composers and pianists in the MGM music department, Calvin Jackson, went uncredited.  This was not uncommon even for white studio musicians.
 In 2001, Kevin Spacey purchased George Stoll's Oscar statuette at a Butterfield & Butterfield estate auction and returned it to the Academy of Motion Picture Arts and Sciences.

References

Notes

Further reading

External links

 
 
 
 

1945 films
1945 musical comedy films
American musical comedy films
American films with live action and animation
American romantic musical films
Tom and Jerry films
Films directed by George Sidney
Films produced by Joe Pasternak
Films scored by Georgie Stoll
Films set in Los Angeles
Metro-Goldwyn-Mayer films
Films about classical music and musicians
Films that won the Best Original Score Academy Award
Films about the United States Navy
1940s American animated films
1940s romantic musical films
Metro-Goldwyn-Mayer cartoon studio films
1940s English-language films